HTK may refer to:
 HTK (software)
 HTK Ltd, a British software company
 Histidine-tryptophan-ketoglutarate, a preservative for donor organs
 Kaman HTK, a helicopter
 HTK Academy of Design, Germany